The Theban Tomb TT147 is located in Dra' Abu el-Naga', part of the Theban Necropolis, on the west bank of the Nile, opposite to Luxor. It is the burial place of an Egyptian called Neferrenpet, who lived during the reign of Amenhotep III.

See also
 List of Theban tombs

References

Theban tombs